Public Square is the central plaza of Downtown Cleveland, Ohio. Based on an 18th-century New England model, it was part of the original 1796 town plat overseen by city founder General Moses Cleaveland of the Connecticut Land Company. The historical center of the city's downtown, it was added to the National Register of Historic Places in 1975.

The  square is centered on the former intersection of Superior Avenue and Ontario Street. Cleveland's three tallest buildings, Key Tower, 200 Public Square and the Terminal Tower, face the square. Other landmarks adjacent to Public Square include the 1855 Old Stone Church and the former Higbee's department store made famous in the 1983 film A Christmas Story, which has been occupied by the Jack Cleveland Casino since 2012.

Originally designed as four separate squares bisected by Superior Avenue and Ontario Street, the square was redeveloped in 2016 by the city into a more pedestrian-friendly environment by routing most traffic around the square. The section of Ontario Street through the square was removed, while the section of Superior Avenue was rebuilt to only allow buses with stops for multiple bus lines of the Greater Cleveland Regional Transit Authority. The northern half of the square is mostly green space and includes a statue to reformist mayor Tom L. Johnson. The southern half is mostly a paved plaza area with a cafe and water feature adjacent to the  Soldiers' and Sailors' Monument and a statue of Moses Cleaveland.

History

Public Square was part of the Connecticut Land Company's original plan for the city, which were overseen by Moses Cleaveland in the 1790s. The square is signature of the layout for early New England towns, which Cleveland was modeled after. While it initially served as a common pasture for settlers' animals, less than a century later Public Square was the height of modernity, when in 1879 it became the first street in the world to be lit with electric street lights, arc lamps designed by Cleveland native Charles F. Brush. The square was added to the National Register of Historic Places on December 18, 1975.

A parking lot now faces the northwest quadrant of the square. A 12-story building, which was built on the spot in 1913, was demolished in 1990 to make way for the new Ameritrust Center, an  skyscraper designed by New York's Kohn Pedersen Fox. Before construction began, Ameritrust was acquired by Society Bank, which was also planning to construct and subsequently relocate to a new building on Public Square—Key Tower (formerly known as Society Center). Because Society did not need two skyscrapers, plans for the Ameritrust building across the square were scrapped.

Other buildings that face the square include 55 Public Square (1958), 75 Public Square (1915), the Society for Savings Building (1890), Metzenbaum Courthouse (1910), the former May Company department store (1914), the Park Building (1903), and the Renaissance Cleveland Hotel (1918). The demolished Cuyahoga Building (1893) and Williamson Building (1900) formerly stood on the site of 200 Public Square.

Public Square is often the site of political rallies and civic functions, including a free annual Independence Day concert by the Cleveland Orchestra. At the Balloonfest '86, close to 1.5 million balloons rose up from Public Square, engulfing the Terminal Tower and setting a world record.

2010s renovation

In collaboration with landscape architect James Corner, the city in 2009 began to explore concepts for a redesign of the square. In October 2011, Cleveland mayor Frank Jackson proposed his plan to redevelop the square, which included closing Superior Avenue and Ontario Street to create a large green space in the center. On October 23, 2014, the Cleveland Landmarks Commission approved a plan which closed Ontario Street but kept Superior Avenue open to bus traffic, and kept the Soldiers' and Sailors' Monument prominent.

The project began construction on March 9, 2015, and was officially opened on June 30, 2016. Public Square's development was showcased during the Cleveland Cavaliers championship parade as a welcome sight with much of the construction materials removed to display the renovation. At first, buses did not run along Superior Avenue as planned, but in order to avoid a $12 million repayment of grants to the Federal Transit Administration, the Greater Cleveland Regional Transit Authority agreed to run buses along it by March 2017. The City of Cleveland installed Jersey Barriers along Superior Avenue due to fears of terrorism contrary to the original design.

An episode of NBC's American Ninja Warrior was held in Public Square and aired in July 2017 A privately operated cafe, Rebol, located in the southwestern area of Public Square, opened in July 2016.

Transportation

Road
Public Square is bounded by East Roadway and West Roadway at the western and eastern ends and by Rockwell Avenue and South Roadway at the northern and southern ends.

In total, ten U.S. and state routes meet at Public Square. It is the northern terminus of SR 3, SR 8, and SR 43; the western terminus of US 322, US 422, SR 14, and SR 87; and the northeastern terminus of US 42. US 6 passes through the square on Superior, and US 20 enters from the west on Superior and leaves via Euclid Avenue. US 21 also terminated at Public Square until that route was truncated to Marietta in 1967.

Public transit

Public Square is adjacent to the Tower City transit station, served by three RTA rail lines. The HealthLine, a bus rapid transit line that travels along Euclid Avenue, terminates at Public Square.

Historical events and popular culture
 On April 28, 1865, the casket of President Abraham Lincoln was on public view in Public Square during his body's trip back to Illinois.
 On the evening of April 29, 1879, Charles F. Brush's new streetlights lit up Public Square for the first time utilizing a generator situated near the Square itself.  
 In 1881, President James A. Garfield lies in state in Public Square following his death
 In 2011, Public Square was transformed into a beer garden and street scene in Stuttgart, Germany, for the filming of The Avengers.

Gallery

See also
Tower City Center
The Mall

References

Further reading

External links 
 

Squares in Cleveland
Urban public parks
Historic districts in Cleveland
National Register of Historic Places in Cleveland, Ohio
Tourist attractions in Cleveland
U.S. Route 6
U.S. Route 20
U.S. Route 42
U.S. Route 322
Downtown Cleveland
U.S. Route 21